George Washington Thomas Lambert  (13 September 1873 – 29 May 1930) was an Australian artist, known principally for portrait painting and as a war artist during the First World War.

Early life
Lambert was born in St Petersburg, Russia, the posthumous son of George Washington Lambert (1833 – 25 July 1873, in London) of Baltimore, Maryland. The younger Lambert's mother was Annie Matilda, née Firth, an Englishwoman. Mother and son soon moved to Württemberg, Germany, to be with Lambert's maternal grandfather. Lambert was educated at Kingston College, Yeovil, Somerset. The family, consisting of Lambert, his mother and three sisters, decided to emigrate to Australia. They arrived in Sydney aboard the Bengal on 20 January 1887.

Career

Lambert began exhibiting his pictures at the Art Society and the Society of Artists, Sydney in 1894. Lambert began contributing pen-and-ink cartoons for The Bulletin in 1895 and began painting full-time in 1896. Illustrations by Lambert formed part of the bush ballads of the Fair girls and gray horses (1898) and Hearts of gold (1903) anthologies of Scottish-Australian poet Will H. Ogilvie (1869–1963).

In 1899 he won the Wynne Prize with Across the Blacksoil Plains. He studied at the Julian Ashton Art School in Sydney until 1900. Later, he won a travelling scholarship for 150 pounds from the government of New South Wales. He spent a year in Paris before moving to London where he exhibited at the Royal Academy. Lambert was awarded a silver medal at an international exhibition for his painting The Sonnet in Barcelona in 1911. He was most known during this time as a portrait artist.

War artist

Lambert became an official Australian war artist in 1917 during the First World War. His painting Anzac, the landing 1915 of the landings on the Gallipoli peninsula in Turkey, is the largest painting at the Australian War Memorial collection. Lambert, as an honorary captain, travelled to Gallipoli in 1919 to make sketches for the painting. Another noted work was A sergeant of the Light Horse (1920), painted in London after his travels in Palestine.

During the war years, George Lambert spent much time in London, where it is suggested he was romantically involved with fellow artist Thea Proctor.

Return to Australia
Lambert returned to Australia in 1921, where he had success in Melbourne with a one-man show at Fine Art Society gallery. He was elected an associate of the Royal Academy in 1922. He often visited the homestead of Colonel Granville Ryrie of the Australian Light Horse at Michelago, New South Wales and there painted The Squatter's Daughter and Michelago Landscape.

In the second annual Archibald Prize in 1922, now Australia's most prestigious art prize for portraiture, Lambert's work was disqualified as he had not been a resident in Australia for twelve months. He submitted a self-portrait for the third year, competing with William Macleod who entered with the subject of The Bulletin cartoonist 'Hop' Hopkins. In 1927 he won the Archibald Prize with his work titled Mrs Murdoch.

In November 1927 he was commissioned to create a statue of writer Henry Lawson; the work depicting Lawson in rough clothes accompanied by a swagman, a dog and a fence post was unveiled in The Domain, Sydney on 28 July 1931 by the Governor of New South Wales, Sir Philip Game.

Personal life
Lambert married Amelia Beatrice 'Amy' Absell (1872–1963) in 1900. Their children were Maurice Lambert (1901–1964), a noted sculptor and associate of the Royal Academy, and Constant, the British composer and conductor, born in London in 1905. Kit Lambert (1935–1981), manager of the rock group The Who, was their grandchild.

Lambert died on 29 May 1930 at Cobbitty, near Camden, New South Wales, and is buried in the Anglican section of South Head Cemetery.

Some of his family papers from 1874 to 1942 are held in the State Library of New South Wales, Sydney.

Gallery

See also

Australian art

Notes

References

Further reading

External links

 
 Artist profile - Australian War Memorial
 Lambert exhibition, Gallipoli and Palestine landscapes - Australian War Memorial
 George Washington Lambert at Australian Art

 Profile on Royal Academy of Arts Collections

1873 births
1930 deaths
Emigrants from the Russian Empire to Australia
World War I artists
Archibald Prize winners
Archibald Prize finalists
Australian portrait painters
George Washington
Russian portrait painters
British war artists
 
Wynne Prize winners
20th-century Australian painters
20th-century Australian male artists
Symbolist painters
Associates of the Royal Academy
Julian Ashton Art School alumni
Australian male painters
Australian people of German descent
Australian people of American descent